The 2007 Lamar Hunt U.S. Open Cup was the 94th edition of the USSF's annual national soccer championship, running from June through early October.

The New England Revolution defeated FC Dallas 3–2 in the final played at Pizza Hut Park, Frisco, Texas.

Pairings for the competition were announced on Tuesday, May 29, 2007.  The 2007 tournament was the first since 2002 to not include all Major League Soccer teams.  Instead, MLS had eight teams in the tournament; six  qualified automatically, while the remaining six US-based sides participated in a playoff for the final two positions.  In another change for the tournament, all nine US-based USL First Division teams entered into the Cup.  The Puerto Rico Islanders are not eligible for the tournament, as Puerto Rico has a soccer federation independent from US Soccer.

Matchdays

Participating teams
The tournament consists of 40 teams, according to the following distribution:

*Includes 8 USL Premier Development League teams and 8 USASA regional qualifiers

Prize money

There is a total of $180,000 in prize money at stake in the 2007 version of the competition.  The prize money breakdown is as follows: $100,000 to the champion, $50,000 to the runner up and $10,000 to the team advancing the deepest in the tournament from each of the Division II, Division III and amateur levels.

Qualifying

Qualified teams by classification

Tier 1: Major League Soccer (MLS)
Chicago Fire
Chivas USA
Colorado Rapids
D.C. United
FC Dallas
Houston Dynamo
Los Angeles Galaxy
New England Revolution

Tier 2: USL First Division (USL-1)
Atlanta Silverbacks
California Victory
Carolina RailHawks
Charleston Battery
Miami FC
Minnesota Thunder
Portland Timbers
Rochester Raging Rhinos
Seattle Sounders

Tier 3: USL Second Division (USL-2)
Charlotte Eagles
Cincinnati Kings
Cleveland City Stars
Crystal Palace Baltimore
Harrisburg City Islanders
Richmond Kickers
Western Mass Pioneers

Tier 4: Premier Development League (PDL)
Bakersfield Brigade
BYU Cougars
Central Florida Kraze
El Paso Patriots
Kansas City Brass
Long Island Rough Riders
Michigan Bucks
Ocean City Barons

Tier 5: United States Adult Soccer Association (USASA)
Aegean Hawks (Va.)
Azzurri FC (Tex.)
Banat Arsenal (Ariz.)
Danbury United (Conn.)
Indios USA (Tex./NPSL)
Lynch's Irish Pub FC (Fla.)
Milwaukee Bavarians (Wisc./NPSL)
RWB Adria (Ill.)

Open Cup bracket
Second Round winners advance to play one of 8 MLS clubs in 16-team knockout tournament 
Home teams listed on top of bracket

Schedule
Note: Scorelines use the standard U.S. convention of placing the home team on the right-hand side of box scores.

First round

Second round

Third round

Quarterfinals

Semifinals

Final

Top scorers

References

External links
 TheCup.us - 2007 match reports and results

Notes
Charlotte v. Lynch's Irish Pub was postponed after delayed and cancelled flights prevented Lynch's Irish Pub from arriving in North Carolina on time. The game was pushed back one day.
Top goal scorers

See also
 2007 U.S. Open Cup qualification
 United States Soccer Federation
 Lamar Hunt U.S. Open Cup
 Major League Soccer
 United Soccer Leagues
 USASA
 National Premier Soccer League

 
Lamar Hunt U.S. Open Cup
Lamar Hunt U.S. Open Cup
2007